In the Chicago mayoral election of 1847, Democratic nominee James Curtiss defeated Liberty nominee Philo Carpenter and Whig nominee John H. Kinzie.

Philo Carpenter had previously been an unsuccessful candidate in the prior election. John H. Kinzie had also previously been an unsuccessful candidate in the  1837 and 1845 mayoral elections.

General election

References

Mayoral elections in Chicago
Chicago
Chicago
1840s in Chicago